St.Joseph's Higher Secondary School may refer to the following schools:

Nagaland, India
 St. Joseph's Higher Secondary School, Viswema

Tamil Nadu, India
 St. Joseph's Higher Secondary School, Ooty
 St. Joseph's Higher Secondary School (Chengalpattu)
 St. Joseph's Higher Secondary School (Cuddalore)

Kerala, India
 St. Joseph's Higher Secondary School, Thiruvananthapuram
 St.Joseph's Higher Secondary School, Thalassery